Chung Jung-yong (born 1 April 1969) is a retired South Korean association footballer.

Honours

Manager
South Korea U20
FIFA U-20 World Cup runner-up: 2019

Individual
AFC Coach of the Year: 2019

References

External links 

1969 births
Living people
Sportspeople from Daegu
South Korean footballers
Association football defenders
South Korean football managers
Seoul E-Land FC managers